Sayellini is a taxonomic tribe of minute ectoparasitic sea snails, marine gastropod molluscs, or micromollusks, in the very large family Pyramidellidae, the pyrams and their allies.

Taxonomy 
The subfamily Sayellinae is one of eleven recognised in the family Pyramidellidae, according to the taxonomy of Ponder & Lindberg (1997).

According to Schander, Van Aartsen & Corgen (1999) there are only two genera in this sub-family.

In the taxonomy of Bouchet & Rocroi (2005), this subfamily has been downgraded to the rank of tribe Sayellini in the subfamily Pyramidellinae.

Genera 
 Sayella Dall, 1885 - type genus of the tribe Sayellini
 Petitella Wise, 1996

References

Pyramidellidae